The 28th BRDC International Trophy was a non-championship Formula One race held at Silverstone on 11 April 1976. The 40-lap race was won from pole position by Englishman James Hunt, driving a McLaren-Ford, who also set the fastest lap. Italian Vittorio Brambilla finished second in a March-Ford, with South African Jody Scheckter third in a Tyrrell-Ford.

Qualifying classification

Race classification

References

BRDC International Trophy
BRDC International Trophy
BRDC
BRDC International Trophy